

Sevenoaks Weald  is a village and civil parish in the Sevenoaks District of Kent, England. The parish is located on the Low Weald, immediately south of Sevenoaks town, with the village of Sevenoaks Weald at its centre. It was formed in 1894 from part of the ancient parish of Sevenoaks.

The village was originally named simply Weald.

The parish church is dedicated to St George. It was built in 1821 and was provided as a chapel of ease so that parishioners did not have the long climb to St. Nicholas, the parish church of Sevenoaks. Land and funds were given for the chapel and churchyards by the Lambarde family.  Architect Thomas Graham Jackson added a chancel in 1871; the funds were provided by the Hodgson family.  Weald Methodist Church on the village green opened in 1843; and also in the village is a former Brethren Gospel Hall dating from 1875 and the former St Edward the Confessor's Roman Catholic Church.

Long Barn is a property with a historic garden, begun in 1915 by Harold Nicolson and Vita Sackville-West and further developed by Edwin Lutyens in 1925.  The nearest train station is Sevenoaks.

Nearest Settlements

See also
List of places of worship in Sevenoaks (district)

References

Notes

Bibliography

External links

Map of parish
 Sevenoaks Wildlife Reserve and Visitor Centre (Kent Wildlife Trust)

Villages in Kent
Civil parishes in Kent
Sevenoaks